Colchicum szovitsii is a species of flowering plant in the family Colchicaceae, native from eastern Bulgaria to northwestern Jordan and Iran. It was first described in 1835.

Subspecies
, two subspecies are recognized:
Colchicum szovitsii subsp. brachyphyllum (Boiss. & Hausskn.) K.Perss. - Lebanon-Syria, Palestine, Turkey
Colchicum szovitsii subsp. szovitsii – eastern Bulgaria to Iran

References

szovitsii
Flora of Bulgaria
Flora of European Turkey
Flora of Iran
Flora of Iraq
Flora of Lebanon and Syria
Flora of Palestine (region)
Flora of the Transcaucasus
Flora of Turkey
Flora of Turkmenistan
Plants described in 1835